Yarensk is a rural locality (a selo) and the administrative center of Lensky District of Arkhangelsk Oblast, Russia, located on the bank of the Vychegda River near its confluence with the Yarenga. Population:

History
The town of Yarensk was documented as early as 1384 as a station on the road leading from Novgorod to the Ural Mountains. In the Russian Empire, it was the seat of a huge uyezd within Vologda Governorate. Much of the present-day Komi Republic was administered from Yarensk. The Tsar used the town as a place of exile, most notably for Prince Vasily Galitzine.

In 1924, the town was demoted in status to that of a rural locality.

Culture
The modern village has a mid-18th century Orthodox cathedral adapted for use as a local history museum.

Yarensk in fiction
Yarensk was one of the Russian towns visited by Robinson Crusoe in Defoe's novel.

References

External links
Website on the history of Yarensk 

Rural localities in Lensky District, Arkhangelsk Oblast
Yarensky Uyezd
Former cities in Russia